Lance A. Liotta (born July 12, 1947) is the Co-Director and Co-Founder of the Center for Applied Proteomics and Molecular Medicine (CAPMM) at George Mason University. His research team was the first to propose the existence of the autocrine motility factor. In 1985, he received the Rhoads Award (since renamed the Award for Outstanding Achievement in Cancer Research) from the American Association for Cancer Research. In 1987, he received the National Lectureship Award from the American Association for Clinical Chemistry. His other awards include the Warner-Lambert Parke Davis Award and the Surgeon General's Medallion.

The House of Representatives oversight subcommittee in 2004 provided evidence that Lance A. Liotta, then a researcher at the National Cancer Institute, had continued to receive thousands of dollars in compensation from a business arrangement through May,, 2004, despite his testimony under oath the previous month that he had suspended the collaboration months before.

References

External links

Living people
1947 births
20th-century American biologists
21st-century American biologists
Hiram College alumni
Case Western Reserve University alumni
George Mason University faculty
Scientists from Cleveland